This is a list of notable non-binary writers, or writers who are genderqueer, agender, bigender, genderfluid, non-binary gender or third gender.

A

 Travis Alabanza, an English performance artist, poet, writer, and LGBTQ rights activist
 K Alexander, a Canadian actor, writer, web series creator and YouTube personality

B

 Thomas Baty (1869–1954), an English lawyer and writer of a utopian science fiction novel set in a postgender society, as well as the editor of the feminist gender studies journal Urania
 Jay Bernard, a black British poet, multi media writer and film maker, shortlisted in the Costa Book Awards 2019
 Tess Berry-Hart, British playwright, author and activist 
 Mal Blum, an American songwriter, musician, writer and performer
 Justin Vivian Bond, an American singer-songwriter, author, painter, performance artist, and actor
 Lydia Brown, an Asian American autistic disability rights activist, writer, and public speaker
 Kate Bornstein, an American author, playwright, performance artist, and gender theorist
 Beth Brant, a Mohawk writer, essayist, and poet 
 Z Brewer, American young adult writer, author of The Chronicles of Vladimir Tod.
 River Butcher, an American stand-up comic, actor, writer, producer, and podcast host
 Alec Butler, a Canadian playwright and filmmaker
 Judith Butler, an American philosopher, gender theorist and feminist writer

C

 Claude Cahun, a Jewish-French photographer, sculptor and writer
 Marjorie Celona, an American-Canadian writer
 Chrystos, a Menominee writer and two-spirit activist
 Ivan Coyote, a Canadian spoken word performer, writer, and LGBT advocate

D

 Harry Dodge, an American sculptor, performer, video artist, and writer
 Jude Ellison Sady Doyle, an American feminist author 
 Cyrus Grace Dunham, an American writer and activist

E

 Akwaeke Emezi, a Nigerian author living in the United States

F

 Waawaate Fobister, a Canadian playwright and actor
 Tyler Ford, writer and public speaker
 L. Frank, a Tongva-Acjachemen artist, writer, tribal scholar, cartoonist, and indigenous language activist

G

 Sarah Gailey, an American author of speculative fiction
 Andrea Gibson, an American poet and activist
 Liv Hewson, an Australian actor and playwright
 Johanna Hedva, author of Sick Woman Theory and On Hell

I

 Eddie Izzard, stand-up comedian, actor, writer and political activist

K

 Yuhki Kamatani, a Japanese manga writer and illustrator 
 Janae Kroc, bodybuilder and writer

L

 Carole LaFavor an Ojibwe novelist, activist and nurse
 Richard LaFortune, a two spirit activist, author, community organizer, and artist
 R. B. Lemberg, a bigender, queer author, poet, and editor of speculative fiction
 Elisha Lim, an artist and graphic novelist
 Cheena Marie Lo, a poet working in Oakland, California
Sarah (Sleam) Leamy, a British agender author, cartoonist, and editor.
 Katherine Locke, a writer of young adult and children's books living in Philadelphia, PA

M

 Gopi Shankar Madurai, Indian equal rights, Indigenous rights activist and author
 Keith Maillard, a Canadian-American novelist and poet 
 Jul Maroh, a French comic book writer
 Jeffrey Marsh, an American writer, actor, artist, activist, author, and social media personality
 Dan Taulapapa McMullin, an American Samoan artist, known for his poetry, visual art and film
 Jack Monroe, a British food writer and journalist
 Foz Meadows, an Australian fantasy novelist, blogger and poet.

O

 Richard O'Brien, a British-New Zealand actor, television presenter, musician, writer, voice artist and theatre performer
 AJ Odasso, American author, editor, and poet

P

 Pidgeon Pagonis, an intersex American activist, writer, artist, and consultant
 Chanda Prescod-Weinstein, a cosmologist, science writer and equality activist

R 

 Marieke Lucas Rijneveld is a Dutch writer and poet.

S

 Joey Soloway, an American television creator, showrunner, director and writer
 Rivers Solomon, an American author
 Rae Spoon, a Canadian musician and writer
 ND Stevenson, an American cartoonist and animation producer
 John Elizabeth Stintzi, Canadian novelist and poet
 Rebecca Sugar, American animator, director, screenwriter, producer, and songwriter
 Mattilda Bernstein Sycamore, an American author and activist

T

 Jacob Tobia, an American LGBTQ rights activist, feminist writer, and co-producer and host for the MSNBC television series Queer 2.0
 Bogi Takács, Agender trans Jewish writer and poet

V

 Joanne Vannicola, Canadian actor and memoirist
 Hida Viloria, a Latinx American writer

W

 Gigi Raven Wilbur, an American bisexual rights activist and writer
 Joshua Whitehead, a Canadian First Nations poet and novelist

Y

 Nao-Cola Yamazaki, Japanese novelist and essayist
 Neon Yang, Singaporean writer of English-language speculative fiction
 Karekin Yarian, an author and social activist from San Francisco

Z
 Xiran Jay Zhao, Chinese-Canadian author and Internet personality
 Nevo Zisin, a non-binary Australian writer and transgender rights activist

See also
List of people with non-binary gender identities
Gender in science fiction

References

Non-binary writers, list of
Non-binary writers, list of